Kazeroon (also Romanized as Kāzerūn, Kāzeroūn, and Kazeroon; also known as Kasrun) is a city and capital of Kazeroon County, Fars Province, Iran. In 2016, as the fifth big city in the province, its population was 96,683.  
Its agricultural products include date palms, citrus orchards, wheat, tobacco, rice, cotton, and vines.

The nearby ruins of the ancient city of Bishapur  N., include bas-relief depictions from the Sasanid era (ca. 224–651). A statue of Shapur I (AD 241–272) can be found in a large cave at the site. The ruins of the Qaleh-ye Gabri (Castle of the Gabrs, or Zoroastrians) are located on a mound SE of Kazeroon.

Climate
Kazerun has a hot semi-arid climate (Köppen climate classification: BSh).

Notable people
Nasrollah Mardani, a famous contemporary Persian poet, is from Kazeroon. It is also believed that Salman the Persian, a companion of the Islamic prophet Muhammad, comes from this city. Haj Sadrallah Zamanian was a pillar of the community for many years. The town is also the scene of a famous battle in the novel My Uncle Napoleon. Kazeroon is a city of Science. Qotb al-Din Kazerooni, Allame Jalaladdin Davani, Allame Ali Davani are from Kazeroon. The mothers of Hafez and Saadi were also from Kazeroon. Firouz Naderi, (the Associate Director of NASA's Jet Propulsion Laboratory (JPL), responsible for Project Formulation and Strategy), was born in Kazeroon. Reza Malekzadeh, a medical scientist and gastroenterologist who is well known in Iran is from Kazeroon.

Places of interest

 Parishan Lake, which is near Kazeroon.
 Shapur River
 Shapur statue (the largest statue of ancient Iran), which is near Bishapur.
 National park Dašt-e Aržan, a vast green meadow on Kazerun–Shiraz highway.

History
The historic city Bishapur is near Kazeroon.  This city was a capital of the Sasanian Empire.

In June 1824, a heavy earthquake occurred in Kazerun and Shiraz that killed a few thousand people.

Since 16 April 2018, as part of the 2017–18 Iranian protests, the city has experienced anti-government protests, with the proximate local cause being a plan by Kazerun lawmaker Hossein Rezazadeh to turn parts of the city's northern outlying districts of Nowdan and Qaemiyeh into a new city named Kuh-e-Chinar. On 18 May 2018, five people were killed after security forces opened fire on demonstrators.

Sister cities
 Al-Mada'in, Iraq

Recreational places
Barm Plain is biggest Plain of Oak in Iran, Davan, Sarmashhad and Kaskan are three villages in Kazeroon.
The old name of Kazeroon was "Green City".

Ashura and Tasua re-enactment
This re-enactment has been one of the most celebrated and unique reenactments in Iran. The date of this re-enactment is in the ninth and tenth of the month Moharram. In these two days, people go out and re-enact the Battle of Karbala. The theater starts from morning until noon. Almost all people in the city walk on the street together. They mourn for this historical event.

See also

Old Kazeruni dialect

References

Cities in Fars Province
Sasanian cities
Populated places in Kazerun County